The following is a list of events relating to television in Ireland from 1972.

Events

23 June – After RTÉ Television airs more film of IRA members, the Irish government meets with the RTÉ Authority to express its displeasure.
24 November – The government dismisses the RTÉ Authority and a new authority is appointed.

Ongoing television programmes
RTÉ News: Nine O'Clock (1961–present)
RTÉ News: Six One (1962–present)
The Late Late Show (1962–present)
The Riordans (1965–1979)
Quicksilver (1965–1981)
Seven Days (1966–1976)
Wanderly Wagon (1967–1982)
Hall's Pictorial Weekly (1971–1980)

Births
4 February – Dara Ó Briain, stand-up comedian and television presenter
21 March – Rachel Allen, celebrity chef, television personality and writer

See also
1972 in Ireland

References

 
1970s in Irish television